Rock Hill Body Company, originally known as Victoria Yarn Mill # 2, is a historic industrial building located at Rock Hill, South Carolina.  It was built about 1915, and is a two-story brick industrial building built as a textile mill. Later modifications include a one-story office addition and an elevator tower addition on the rear. It was the home of the Rock Hill Body Company, one of the earliest makers of truck bodies and school bus bodies in South Carolina, from 1938 to 1986.

It was listed on the National Register of Historic Places in 2008.

References

Industrial buildings and structures on the National Register of Historic Places in South Carolina
Industrial buildings completed in 1915
Buildings and structures in Rock Hill, South Carolina
National Register of Historic Places in Rock Hill, South Carolina
Textile mills in the United States
Coachbuilders of the United States
Motor vehicle manufacturing plants on the National Register of Historic Places
Transportation buildings and structures on the National Register of Historic Places in South Carolina